John Maurice Peddelty (born 23 May 1950) is an English former footballer who made 69 appearances in the Football League playing as a midfielder for Carlisle United and Darlington. He also played non-league football for clubs including South Shields.

Peddelty joined Samuel King's School, in Alston, Cumbria, as deputy head in September 1990, was appointed headteacher in September 2000, and retired from that post in December 2008.

References

1950 births
Living people
Footballers from Carlisle, Cumbria
English footballers
Association football midfielders
Carlisle United F.C. players
Darlington F.C. players
South Shields F.C. (1936) players
English Football League players